National Tertiary Route 813, or just Route 813 (or ) is a National Road Route of Costa Rica, located in the Limón province.

Description
In Limón province the route covers Matina canton (Matina district).

Junction list
The whole route is located in Matina district.

References

Highways in Costa Rica